James Wadsworth (1572?–1623) was an English Catholic priest and Jesuit.

Life
Wadsworth was elected scholar at Emmanuel College, Cambridge, on 12 March 1584, admitted sizar in 1585, and graduated M.A. in 1593, B.D. in 1600. He was instituted in 1598 to the rectory of Pakefield in Suffolk, and from 1600 he held in addition, at any rate until 1603, the livings of Cotton and Thornham Magna in the same county. He was also chaplain in ordinary to William Redman, bishop of Norwich.

In May 1605 he accompanied Sir Charles Cornwallis to Spain as chaplain; his brother Paul was consul in Andalusia. At Valladolid James fell under jesuit influence; in August of the same year he left the ambassador's house under pretext of a visit to the University of Salamanca, and never returned. Cornwallis, in letters to the Robert Cecil, 1st Earl of Salisbury, 15 September 1605, suggested that family and financial problems had been the cause.

Wadsworth became an officer of the inquisition in Seville, receiving from the king of Spain a pension of forty ducats a month. Five years later, in 1610, his wife and children arrived, and also joined the Catholic faith.

Wadsworth became steward or agent to Sir Robert Shirley, and, on the proposed Spanish match, was appointed English tutor to the Infanta Maria. He died of consumption on 30 November 1623, and was buried at Madrid.

Works
From 1615 to 1620 Wadsworth engaged in correspondence with his early college friend and neighbour in a Suffolk parsonage, William Bedell, later bishop of Kilmore, in support of his beliefs. His correspondence with Sir Robert Phelips, chiefly about the Spanish match, from 1618 has not been published. In a letter to George Villiers, 1st Duke of Buckingham, written from Madrid, 11 Nov. 1623 he reported that his pupil the Infanta was learning English. A Grammar, Spanish and English, London, 1622, may have been prepared by Wadsworth for the Infanta.

Family
Wadsworth married while in Suffolk, and had four children. According to his son (James) he was converted to Catholicism in 1604.

See also

References

Attribution
 Endnotes:
T. W. Jones's Life of Bedell (Camden Soc.), 1872, p. 95;
 James Wadsworth (his son), The English Spanish Pilgrim, 1629, 4to;
Strype's Annals, vol. iii. pt. i. p. 421

1572 births
1623 deaths
17th-century English Jesuits
16th-century English Anglican priests
Alumni of Emmanuel College, Cambridge
Tuberculosis deaths in Spain
17th-century deaths from tuberculosis